Dzhrashen may refer to:
 Jrashen (disambiguation), multiple places in Armenia
 Verin Dzhrashen, Armenia